Mbalala,  is an urban center in the Central Region of Uganda.

Location
The coordinates of the town are 0°22'11.0"N, 32°49'23.0"E (Latitude:0.369716; Longitude:32.823048).

Overview
The town is home to two Chinese, manufacturing companies (a) Tian Tang Group and (b) Global Paper Limited. Tian Tang manufactures steel and mattresses. Global Paper manufactures paper products. Together, the two factories employ in excess of 1,000 people, and operate 24 hours daily.

See also
List of cities and towns in Uganda

References

External links
 Showcasing the Rapid solar dryer innovation to farmers in Mbalala, Mukono District, Uganda

Mukono District
Populated places in Central Region, Uganda
Cities in the Great Rift Valley